Niilo Kalervo Kallio (28 March 1909 – 2 November 1969) was a Finnish sculptor. He was the son of the fourth President of Finland Kyösti Kallio.

Kallio's most famous works are the memorial statue of his father, located in Helsinki, and the bust of the 35th Vice President of the United States Alben W. Barkley. The bust is placed at the United States Senate Vice Presidential Bust Collection in Washington, D.C..

Famous works 
Leevi Madetoja grave memorial, Hietaniemi cemetery, Helsinki (1955)
Jätkänpatsas, Rovaniemi (1955)
Bust of Alben W. Barkley, United States Senate Vice Presidential Bust Collection, Washington, D.C. (1958)
Kyösti Kallio memorial, Helsinki (1962)
The Javelin Thrower, Pori Stadium, Pori (1966)
Statue of Carl Gustaf Emil Mannerheim, Mikkeli (1967)

References 

1909 births
1969 deaths
People from Nivala
People from Oulu Province (Grand Duchy of Finland)
20th-century Finnish sculptors
Burials at Hietaniemi Cemetery
Children of national leaders